Frances Charlotte Greenwood (June 25, 1890 – December 28, 1977) was an American actress and dancer. Born in Philadelphia, Greenwood started in vaudeville, and starred on Broadway, movies and radio. Standing almost six feet tall (some sources say 5'10"), she was best known for her long legs and high kicks. She earned the unique praise of being, in her words, the "...only woman in the world who could kick a giraffe in the eye."

Theatre
In 1913, Oliver Morosco cast her as Queen Ann Soforth of Oogaboo late in the run of L. Frank Baum and Louis F. Gottschalk's The Tik-Tok Man of Oz (better known in its novelization as Tik-Tok of Oz). In 1916, Morosco commissioned a successful star vehicle stage play titled So Long Letty. In 1919 Morosco brought her back in the sequel Linger Longer Letty. This role made her a star; she reprised it in the 1929 movie of the same name.

She appeared with actors including Charles Ruggles, Betty Grable, Jimmy Durante, Eddie Cantor, Buster Keaton, and Carmen Miranda. Most of Greenwood's best work was done on the stage, and was lauded by such critics as James Agate, Alexander Woollcott, and Claudia Cassidy.  One of her most successful roles was that of Juno in Cole Porter's Out of This World  in which she introduced the Porter classic "I Sleep Easier Now". She had some discomfort with that play, as she had become a devout Christian Scientist and feared the play was too risqué.

Film
Greenwood appeared in numerous moving pictures. When not showcasing her trademark high kick in comic roles she could be found in the occasional serio comic role such as Lon McAllister's aunt in Home in Indiana. Her last memorable role was as the feisty "Aunt Eller" in the 1955 film adaptation of Rodgers and Hammerstein's Oklahoma! (1955), starring Gordon MacRae and Shirley Jones.

Radio
Greenwood had her own radio program, The Charlotte Greenwood Show, a situation comedy. It was broadcast 1944-1946, first on ABC and later on NBC. She also was in "Home in Indiana" on Lux Radio Theatre October 2, 1944.

Recordings
Greenwood ventured into recorded music with an album of songs from Cole Porter's musical Out of This World and another from the musical comedy Oh, by Jingo.

Personal life
Greenwood first married actor Cyril Ring, brother of actress Blanche Ring. They divorced. Her second husband was composer Martin Broones. He died in 1971. Both unions were childless. In her post-retirement years, this comedienne who, in her own words, was “the only woman in the world who could kick a giraffe in the eye”, suffered severely from arthritis, though that word was not part of her vocabulary. She and Broones were Christian Scientists – he was a C.S. practitioner for several years, and consulted with Doris Day in that capacity. Greenwood died in Los Angeles, California, aged 87. She had been out of the public eye for decades and it was months before the world took notice.

Stage work

Filmography

References

Sources
Hayter-Menzies, Grant. Charlotte Greenwood: The Life and Career of the Comic Star of Vaudeville, Radio and Film. McFarland & Company, Inc., Jefferson, North Carolina and London, 2007; .

External links

 
 
 
Charlotte Greenwood web site
Victoria Times-Colonist, Adrian Chamberlain, May 26, 2007
 1925 portrait of Charlotte Greenwood modeling fur and her hair coiffed taken by Benjamin Strauss and Homer Peyton
lithograph to the 1919 musical Linger Longer Letty

1890 births
1977 deaths
20th-century American actresses
20th-century American dancers
20th Century Studios contract players
American female dancers
American film actresses
American radio actresses
American stage actresses
American musical theatre actresses
American Christian Scientists
Actresses from Philadelphia
Converts to Christian Science
Dancers from Pennsylvania
Metro-Goldwyn-Mayer contract players
Vaudeville performers